A referendum on accident and health insurance was held in Switzerland on 2 October 1890. Voters were asked whether they approved of a federal resolution on amending the constitution with regards to accident and health insurance. It was approved by a majority of voters and cantons.

Background
The referendum was a mandatory referendum, which as it pertained to the constitution, required both a majority of voters and cantons, as opposed to an optional referendum, which required only a majority of the public vote.

Results

References

1890 referendums
1890 in Switzerland
Referendums in Switzerland